Kalat (also Romanized as Kalāt) is a village in Akhand Rural District, Central District, Asaluyeh County, Bushehr Province, Iran. At the 2006 census, its population was 333, in 70 families.

References 

Populated places in Asaluyeh County